Operation Matador was an amphibious thrust, during the Burma Campaign in January 1945, to capture the strategic port of Kyaukpyu, located at the northern tip of Ramree Island, south of Akyab across Hunter's Bay, as well as the key airfield near the port. On 21 January 1945, an hour before the Indian 71st Brigade was to land, the battleship  opened fire with her main battery while planes from the escort carrier  spotted for her.  The light cruiser  also joined the bombardment, along with Liberators and Thunderbolts of No. 224 Group RAF which bombed and strafed to soften up the beaches.  The assault troops landed unopposed and secured the beachhead; the following day, the Indian 4th Infantry Brigade landed.

See also
Battle of Ramree Island

References

World War II operations and battles of the Southeast Asia Theatre
Matador
Naval battles and operations of World War II involving the United Kingdom
Military history of Burma during World War II
January 1945 events in Asia